Gettysburg Regional Airport , formerly known as the Gettysburg Airport and Travel Center and as Doersom Airport, is a general aviation airport located two miles (4 km) west of the Gettysburg, in Adams County, Pennsylvania.

The airport opened in 1926 and had been a privately operated general aviation service airport. On August 25, 2006, the Susquehanna Area Regional Airport Authority acquired the airport and changed its official name.

Facilities 
Gettysburg Regional Airport has one runway:
 Runway 6/24: 3,100 x 60 ft (945 x 18 m), Surface: Asphalt
 Partial taxiway on either side of the runway provides access to the hangar areas and fuel farm.
 Landside facilities include four hangar units, 18,682 (sq ft) of hangar space.

Statistics 
 9,600 total aircraft operations for 2005

References

Gettysburg Regional Airport (official site)

Great Circle Mapper: GTY - Gettysburg Regional Airport

External links 
Pennsylvania Bureau of Aviation: Gettysburg Regional Airport

Airports in Pennsylvania
Gettysburg, Pennsylvania
Transportation buildings and structures in Adams County, Pennsylvania